Losen may refer to:

 Lösen, a village in Sweden
 Losen Records, a Norwegian record label

See also 
 Lozen (disambiguation)
 Lossen, a surname, see 
 Lausen, a municipality in Switzerland